Matías Donnet (born 18 April 1980 in Esperanza, Santa Fe) is an Argentine former professional footballer who played as a midfielder.

Club career
With Boca Juniors he won the Intercontinental Cup 2003, the Copa Libertadores de América 2003, and the Copa Sudamericana 2004 . At the match for the Intercontinental Cup, Donnet scored the equalizer that took the match to penalty shootout, won by Boca 3–1, and was named Man of the Match.

In 2006, he signed with D.C. United of Major League Soccer in the USA. He scored his first and only goal in the MLS on September 26, 2006 against New York Red Bulls. The goal was scored in the 89th minute and turned out to have been the game winner when Red Bull's Jozy Altidore scored to make the score 4–3 United.

Donnet left D.C. United after the 2006 season and returned to Argentina with Belgrano de Córdoba. Between 2007 and 2009 he played for Newell's Old Boys before returning to his first club Unión de Santa Fe. In summer 2014, Donnet signed with Antigua GFC of the Guatemalan Liga Mayor for one year. He is currently one of their top players in the clausura 2015 season.

In April 2016, Donnet returned to his childhood club Juventud. He decided to rest in 2018, but in February 2019 it was confirmed, that he would take one more year at the club.

Coaching career
At the end of 2019 it was confirmed, that Donnet had been hired as a youth coach at Boca Juniors.

References

External links
 Argentine Primera Statistics at Fútbol XXI 
 ESPN profile 
 MLS bio
 Press Release on signing with DC United
 Washington Post profile

1980 births
Living people
People from Esperanza, Santa Fe
Association football midfielders
Argentine footballers
Argentine expatriate footballers
Argentine people of French descent
Unión de Santa Fe footballers
Venezia F.C. players
Boca Juniors footballers
D.C. United players
Club Atlético Belgrano footballers
Newell's Old Boys footballers
Club Olimpia footballers
Antigua GFC players
Argentine Primera División players
Serie A players
Major League Soccer players
Expatriate footballers in Paraguay
Expatriate footballers in Italy
Expatriate soccer players in the United States
Argentine expatriate sportspeople in Italy
Argentine expatriate sportspeople in the United States
Argentine expatriate sportspeople in Paraguay
Sportspeople from Santa Fe Province